The Refutation of All Heresies, also called the Elenchus or Philosophumena, is a compendious Christian polemical work of the early third century, whose attribution to Hippolytus of Rome or an unknown "Pseudo-Hippolytus" is disputed. It catalogues both pagan beliefs and 33 gnostic Christian systems deemed heretical by Hippolytus, making it a major source of information on contemporary opponents of Christian orthodoxy as understood today.

The first book, a synopsis of Greek philosophy, circulated separately in several manuscripts and was known as the Philosophoumena ( "philosophical teachings"), a title which some extend to the whole work. Books IV-X were recovered in 1842 in a manuscript at Mount Athos, while books II and III remain lost. The work was long attributed to the early Christian theologian Origen.

Contents
Hippolytus's work is divided into ten books, 8 of which have survived more or less intact. Books II and III, however, have not been unearthed, and their contents remain the subject of conjecture 

Book I offers a summary of the thought of various ancient Greek philosophers. Catherine Osborne identifies Book I as being an important source of information on Pre-Socratic Philosophy. Hippolytus's most extensive treatment is given to the works of Pythagoras, Plato, and Aristotle. An outline of the philosophies of the Brahmins of India, Zamolxis of Thrace and the Celtic druids and also of the mythological poetry of Hesiod is given here.

Book IV details and seeks to refute the various beliefs and practices of various diviners and magicians, i.e., the Chaldeans,  the Metoposcopists, the Magicians, and those who practice divination by astronomy. Hippolytus closes this book by explaining the connection he perceives between the Gnostic heresies of Valentinus and Simon Magus and certain ideas Hippolytus ascribes to Pythagoras, thus linking his discussion of Greek philosophy in Book I with his later arguments against Gnosticism.

Book V concerns itself with the Ophite heresies. Hippolytus in particular identifies the Naassenes, the Peratae, the Sethians, and the beliefs of the heretic Justinus. Once again, Hippolytus identifies the source of the Ophite error as being rooted in the philosophy of the ancients. In Chapter 2 of this book, he accuses the Naassenes of believing that the pagan god "Attis has been emasculated, that is, he has passed over from the earthly parts of the nether world to the everlasting substance above, where...there is neither female nor male, but a new creature, a new man, which is hermaphrodite" [trans. J. H. McMahon] and of conflating Jesus and Attis based on the Gospel of Thomas and the Gospel according to the Egyptians.

In Book VI, Hippolytus resumes his attack begun at the end of Book IV against Simon Magus and Valentinus. He sketches out their ideas, again affirming the source of their error to be the teaching of Pythagoras. Hippolytus devotes the remainder of the book to discussing the heresies of Valentinus' supposed followers.

Book VII challenges the teachings of such heretics as Basilides and his disciple Saturnilus, Marcion of Sinope, and Carpocrates of Alexandria, among others. These heresiarchs all held varying opinions on the God of the Old Testament, from Saturnilus, who Hippolytus states believed that "the God of the Jews is one of the angels", directly opposed by Christ, to Carpocrates who asserted that the Father was for the most part aloof from physical creation, which had been formed by his angels.

A discussion of the heretical Docetae begins Hippolytus's Book VIII. Who exactly the Docetae were is unclear, though Hippolytus seems to make a distinction between this group and others who considered Jesus to exist merely in appearance, the latter being the doctrine to which the term "Docetism" is now affixed. Hippolytus associates this heresy with a misinterpretation of the Parable of the Sower of Matthew's Gospel and a belief that Christ's soul was separated from his body at his Crucifixion. Hippolytus proceeds to explain and argue against the Gnostics Monoimus, Tatian, and Hermogenes, before digressing from the Gnostic theme to refute the practices of the Quartodecimans. He likewise condemns the "Phrygians", i.e., the followers of Montanus and the Gnostic heresy of the Encratites.

Book IX begins with a refutation of the heresy of Noetus. In this particular error, Hippolytus implicates the now-canonised popes Zephyrinus and Callixtus I. This theme of Hippolytus' conflict with the papacy is expanded upon in the second chapter of Book IX, which deals in particular with the errors of Pope Callixtus, whom Hippolytus identifies as a "sorcerer". He then attacks the Elcesaites, who he says had a different baptismal practice than that of orthodox Christians. Book IX concludes with a summary of the heresy of the Jews, whom Hippolytus divides into Pharisees, Sadducees, and Essenes.

Book X concludes the work with Hippolytus' summary of what he has written.

Legacy
The Refutation has been a significant source for contemporary scholars on various subjects since its discovery. The compendious breadth of the Refutation illuminates for the reader not only various Gnostic beliefs, but is also a source of "valuable information on the thinking of the Presocratics." The text is also an important source of Pythagorean and Neopythagorean teachings, with which Hippolytus frequently relates the heresies he describes.

Notes

Bibliography
 Miroslav Marcovich, (ed.), Refutatio Omnium Haeresium, Berlin, Walter de Gruyter, 1986 (critical edition of the Greek text).
 Refutation of All Heresies, translated with an Introduction and notes by M. David Litwa, Atlanta, SBL Press, 2016.
Réfutation de de toutes les hérésies, intr. and transl. by Hans van Kasteel, Grez-Doiceau, Beya, 2019.

External links
Online text (English)
Refutation of all Heresies English from archive

3rd-century books
Christian anti-Gnosticism
3rd-century Christian texts
Athos manuscripts
Early Christianity and Gnosticism
Works by Hippolytus of Rome
Elcesaites